Chanderi tehsil is a fourth-order administrative and revenue division, a subdivision of third-order administrative and revenue division of Ashoknagar district of Madhya Pradesh.

Geography
Chanderi tehsil has an area of 1029.79 sq kilometers. It is bounded by Isagarh tehsil in the west and northwest, Shivpuri district in the north, Uttarpradesh  in the northeast, east and southeast, Mungaoli tehsil in the south, Ashoknagar tehsil in the southwest.

See also 
Ashoknagar district

Citations

External links

Tehsils of Madhya Pradesh
Ashoknagar district